Antisymmetric or skew-symmetric may refer to:
 Antisymmetry in linguistics
 Antisymmetric relation in mathematics
 Skew-symmetric graph
 Self-complementary graph

In mathematics, especially linear algebra, and in theoretical physics, the adjective antisymmetric (or skew-symmetric) is used for matrices, tensors, and other objects that change sign if an appropriate operation (e.g. matrix transposition) is performed. See:
 Skew-symmetric matrix (a matrix A for which )
 Skew-symmetric bilinear form is a bilinear form B such that  for all x and y.
 Antisymmetric tensor in matrices and index subsets.
 "antisymmetric function" – odd function

See also
 Symmetry in mathematics